Bruce Mitchell Clarke (born 4 October 1910, date of death unknown) was a football player who played as a right half for Fulham in the Football League. He also played in England for Worcester City and in Scotland for Hillside Juniors, Montrose and Third Lanark (where he won the Scottish Division Two title in 1930–31 and was selected for two editions of the Glasgow Football Association's annual challenge match against Sheffield.)

Clarke's grandson Chad Perris is an international para-athlete for Australia.

References

1910 births
Year of death missing
Soccer players from Johannesburg
South African soccer players
Montrose F.C. players
Third Lanark A.C. players
Fulham F.C. players
Worcester City F.C. players
English Football League players
Scottish Football League players
Association football wing halves